The 20th Congress of the Communist Party of the Soviet Union was held during the period 14–25 February 1956. It is known especially for First Secretary Nikita Khrushchev's "Secret Speech", which denounced the personality cult and dictatorship of Joseph Stalin.

Delegates at this Congress of the Communist Party of the Soviet Union were given no warning of what to expect. Indeed, proceedings were opened by First Secretary Khruschev's call for all to stand in memory of the Communist leaders who had died since the previous Congress, in which he mentioned Stalin in the same breath as Klement Gottwald. Hints of a new direction only came out gradually over the next ten days, which had the effect of leaving those present highly perplexed. The Polish communist leader Bolesław Bierut died in Moscow shortly after attending the 20th Congress.

The congress elected the 20th Central Committee.

Secret speech 

On 25 February, the last day of the Congress, it was announced that an unscheduled session had been called for the Soviet delegates. First Secretary Khrushchev's morning speech began with vague references to the harmful consequences of elevating a single individual so high that he took on the "supernatural characteristics akin to those of a god." Khrushchev went on to say that such a mistake had been made about Stalin. He himself had been guilty of what was, in essence, a distortion of the basic principles of Marxism-Leninism.

The attention of the audience was then drawn to Lenin's Testament, copies of which had been distributed, criticising Stalin's "rudeness". Further accusations, and hints of accusations, followed, including the suggestion that the murder of Sergei Kirov in 1934, the event that sparked the Great Terror, could be included in the list of Stalin's crimes. While denouncing Stalin, Khrushchev carefully praised the Communist Party, which had the strength to withstand all the negative effects of imaginary crimes and false accusations. The Party, in other words, had been a victim of Stalin, not an accessory to his crimes. He finished by calling on the Party to eradicate the cult of personality and return to "the revolutionary fight for the transformation of society."

The speech shocked delegates to the Congress, as it flew in the face of years of Soviet propaganda, which had claimed that Stalin was a wise, peaceful, and fair leader. After long deliberations, in a month the speech was reported to the general public, but the full text was published only in 1989. Not everyone was ready to accept Khrushchev's new line. Communist Albanian leader Enver Hoxha, for instance, strongly condemned Khrushchev as "revisionist" and severed diplomatic relations. The speech was also seen as a catalyst for the anti-Soviet uprisings in Poland and Hungary of 1956, and was seen as a "major stimulus" to the Sino–Soviet split.

See also 
Khrushchev's Thaw

References

Further reading 
 Smith, Kathleen E. Moscow 1956: The Silenced Spring. Cambridge, MA: Harvard University Press, 2017.

External links 
Report of the Central Committee of the Communist Party of the Soviet Union to the 20th Party Congress by Nikita Khrushchev
 Resolutions of the 20th Congress of the Communist Party of the Soviet Union (February 1956)
Twentieth Congress of the Communist Party of the Soviet Union in the Great Soviet Encyclopedia, 3rd Edition (1970–1979).

February 1956 events in Europe
Communist Party of the Soviet Union 20
De-Stalinization
1956 conferences
1956 in Moscow